School of Fire is the second novel of the military science fiction StarFist Saga by American writers David Sherman and Dan Cragg.  In this installment, the men of 34th FIST (Fleet Initial Strike Team), are deployed to help the rulers of Wanderjahr put down a rebellion that threatens the planet's political and economic stability. The Marines have two battles to fight — that they're aware of at least — one with the resourceful and well-led guerillas, and the other with the entrenched bureaucracy of the planetary police.  But the 34th FIST gradually becomes aware that not all is what it seems.  As the Marines are drawn deeper and deeper into the convoluted politics of Wanderjahr, they begin to suspect that the guerillas might not be the real enemy after all.

The next book in the series is Steel Gauntlet.

1998 science fiction novels
StarFist series
1998 novels
Del Rey books